This is a list of members of the Western Australian Legislative Council from 22 May 1986 to 21 May 1989. The chamber had 34 seats made up of 17 provinces each electing two members, on a system of rotation whereby one-half of the members would retire at each triennial election.

During the term, the Acts Amendment (Electoral Reform) Act 1987 (No.40 of 1987) was passed, which abolished all provinces and created six new multi-member electoral regions to be filled with a system of proportional representation. Terms were increased to four years, but all members retired at each election in contrast with previous practice. There was no transition period—all present members would retire on 21 May 1989, and the new arrangement would take effect the following day based on the results of the 4 February 1989 election.

Notes
 Sandy Lewis resigned from the Liberal Party in March 1986 following the decision by the Shadow Ministry to appoint standing committee chairmen from amongst its own numbers. He rejoined the party in October 1986, but left again after failing to be preselected in mid-1988.
 On 24 July 1987, South-West Province Liberal MLC Vic Ferry resigned. Liberal candidate Barry House won the resulting by-election on 24 October 1987.

Sources
 
 
 

Members of Western Australian parliaments by term